

The Las Cabañas Bridge is a historic highway bridge in Adjuntas municipality, Puerto Rico. Built in 1919 to provide access to a key coffee-producing region, it was financed by nearby plantations through public subscription. Designer Rafael Nones and builder Félix Benítez Rexach, two of the most prominent figures in Puerto Rican bridge construction in the early 20th century, used a unique combination of steel and concrete technologies to produce a girder design unlike any other on the island and possibly beyond.

The bridge was added to the U.S. National Register of Historic Places in 1995.

See also
 National Register of Historic Places listings in Adjuntas, Puerto Rico

Notes

References

External links
 Summary sheet from the Puerto Rico State Historic Preservation Office 
 
 , National Register of Historic Places cover documentation

Road bridges on the National Register of Historic Places in Puerto Rico
Bridges completed in 1919
Adjuntas, Puerto Rico
Girder bridges in the United States
Steel bridges in the United States
Concrete bridges in the United States
1919 establishments in Puerto Rico